Maria Mihaela Tivadar (née Urcan; born 14 June 1982) is a Romanian handball player. She plays for the Romanian club Corona Brașov.

References 

Living people
Romanian female handball players 
1982 births